Namibia participated at the 2018 Summer Youth Olympics in Buenos Aires, Argentina from 6 October to 18 October 2018.

Competitors

Archery

Individual

Team

Field hockey

 Girls' tournament - 1 team of 9 athletes

Girls' Tournament 

 Preliminary round

Quarter finals

Crossover

Seventh and eighth place

Gymnastics

Trampoline
Namibia qualified one gymnast based on its performance at the 2018 African Junior Championship.

 Girls' trampoline - 1 quota

Multidiscipline

References

Nations at the 2018 Summer Youth Olympics
Namibia at the Youth Olympics